The World Masters Games is an international multi-sport event held every four years which, in terms of competitor numbers, has developed into the largest of its kind. Governed by the International Masters Games Association (IMGA), the World Masters Games is open to sports people of all abilities and most ages – the minimum age criterion ranges between 25 and 35 years depending on the sport. Auckland, New Zealand hosted the event's ninth edition from 21 to 30 April 2017.

Anyone can participate in the games so long as they are over the age of 35 though some sports will allow athletes who are younger than that. Participants compete for themselves – there are no country delegations. Beyond the age requirement and membership in that sport's governing body, there are no competition qualification requirements.

History 
 Toronto staged the first World Masters Games in 1985. Since then, World Masters Games has also taken place in Aalborg, Aarhus and Herning (1989), Brisbane (1994), Portland, Oregon (1998), Melbourne (2002), Edmonton (2005) and Sydney (2009). The Sydney 2009 World Masters Games attracted a record 28,676 competitors. This is more than double the number of competitors that took part in the Sydney 2000 Olympic Games.

The Games has been popular with retired professional athletes and former Olympic competitors, with over 230 past Olympians taking part in the 2009 edition.

Summer Games

2013 World Masters Games
Venues
Stadio Olimpico - Archery
Stadio Primo Nebiolo - Athletics
Stadio del Ghiaccio PalaTazzoli - Badminton
Passobuole - Baseball, Softball
Cus Panetti - Basketball, Volleyball (beach)
Cus E11 Modigliani - Basketball
Cus palaBallin - Basketball
Cus Moncrivello - Basketball
Cus E10 Alvaro - Basketball
Cus Palaruffini - Basketball
Cus Palestra Braccini - Basketball
Palestra Parri - Volleyball
Cus Centro 2D - Volleyball
Sebastopoli - Volleyball
Manzoni - Volleyball
Cus Bertolla - Volleyball (beach)
Cus PalaVela - Volleyball (beach)
- Volleyball
A.s.d Pozzo Strada - Lawn bowls (lyonnaise, raffa, lawn bowls)
A.s.d Petanque Taurinense e la Mole - Lawn bowls (petanque)
Torino Fiume Po - Canoeing
Ivrea - Canoeing 
Lago di Candia - Canoeing 
Piscina Acquatica - Canoeing 
Parco del Valentino - Athletics, Cycling Road Race, Duathlon, Triathlon
Parco Leopardi - Cycling Mountain Bike
Velodromo Francone - Cycling Track
Campi Pellerina - Football
Santa Rita - Football
Cbs -Football
Cenisia - Football
Beppe Viola - Football
Rapid Torino - Football
Golf Club Torino La Mandria - Golf
Royal Park i Roveri - Golf
Hockey club Bra - Hockey
Stadio Tazzol - Hockey
Palestra Centro Storico - Judo, Karate
Sestriere Torino - Orienteering
Cesana Torinese
Pragelato
Bardonecchia
Lago di Candia - Rowing
Impianto Angelo Albonico - Rugby
Circolo Vela Orta - Sailing
Remiro Gozzano
Shooting range Racconigi Tiro Valo - Shooting Clay Target
Poligono Tiro a Segno Nazionale - Shooting Pistol and Rifle
Sport City Torino - Squash
Palanuoto - Swimming
Stadio del ghiaccio Tazzoli - Table tennis
PalaMirafiori - Taekwondo
Sporting Club La Stampa - Tennis
Palasport Le Cupole - Weightlifting
Giovanni Paolo II - Baseball, Softball
Impianto Fanton - Softball
Servais - Softball

2017 World Masters Games

Venues

ASB Showgrounds - Archery Indoor
Massey Archery Club - Archery Field
Cornwall Park - Archery Target
The Trusts Arena - Athletics Track and Field, Volleyball Indoor
Auckland Domain - Athletics Cross Country
Auckland Waterfront - Athletics Road Running, Cycling Time Trial, Triathlon
Auckland Badminton Centre - Badminton
North Harbour Badminton Centre - Badminton
Lloyd Elsmore Park - Baseball, Rugby union
AUT University, North Shore Campus - Basketball
Bruce Pulman Park - Basketball, Touch Football
The North Shore Events Centre - Basketball
Lake Pupuke - Canoeing Canoe Polo, Dragon Boating, Canoe Racing and Waka Ama
Wero - Canoeing Canoe Slalom
Takapuna Beach - Canoeing Ocean Racing and Waka Ama, Surf Life Saving, Swimming Open Water
Lake Karapiro – Rowing
Wynyard Quarter - Cycling Criterium
Woodhill Mountain Bike Park - Cycling Mountain Biking
Avantidrome, Cambridge - Cycling Track
Clevedon Roads - Cycling Road Race
North Harbour Stadium (QBE Stadium) - Football, Hockey
Westlake Boys and Girls High School - Football, Hockey
Akarana Golf Club - Golf
Muriwai Golf Club - Golf
Pakuranga Golf Club - Golf
Remuera Golf Club - Golf
Carlton Cornwall Bowls - Lawn bowls
Mt Eden Bowling Club - Lawn bowls
Auckland Netball Centre - Netball
Woodhill forest - Orienteering Long distance
Massey University (Albany Campus) - Orienteering Sprint Model
The University of Auckland (Epsom Campus) - Orienteering Sprint Qualification
The University of Auckland (City Campus) - Orinteering Sprint Finals
Torbay Sailing Club - Sailing
Waitemata Clay Target Club - Shooting
North Harbour Softball Stadium - Softball
Rangitoto College - Softball
North Shore Squash Club - Squash
AUT Millennium - Swimming Pool, Weightlifting
Auckland Table Tennis Centre - Table tennis
Albany Tennis Centre - Tennis
Mairangi Bay Beach Volleyball Centre - Volleyball Beach
West Wave Aquatic Centre - Water polo
Eden Park - Opening ceremony
Entertainment Hub Queens Wharf - Closing ceremony

Winter Games

Sports
2017 Summer Games Sports List (28) :

Archery
Athletics
Badminton 
Baseball
Basketball
Canoe
Cycling
Football
Golf
Hockey
Lawn Bowls
Netball
Orienteering
Rowing
Rugby
Sailing
Shooting
Softball
Squash
Surf Lifesaving
Swimming
Table Tennis
Tennis 
Touch Football
Triathlon
Volleyball
Water Polo
Weightlifting

Americas Masters Games 

The Americas Masters Games is a regional multi-sport event which involves participants from the Americas region. Governed by the International Masters Games Association (IMGA), the Americas Masters Games is open to participants of all abilities and most ages – the minimum age criterion is 30 years. Participants compete for themselves, instead of their countries. There are no competition qualification requirements apart from the age requirement and membership in that sport's governing body.

The event's first edition was hosted by Vancouver, Canada from 26 August to 4 September 2016. The second edition was scheduled for 2020 in Rio de Janeiro, Brazil but was cancelled due to the COVID-19 outbreak.

See also 
 Asia Pacific Masters Games
 European Masters Games
 Americas Masters Games
 Australian Masters Games
 Senior Olympics
 Huntsman World Senior Games
 Masters athletics

References

External links 
 
 
 2013 World Masters Games official website
 2017 World Masters Games official website
 2021 World Masters Games official website
 2020 Winter World Masters Games official website

World
 
Quadrennial sporting events
1985 establishments in North America